Hibbertia tenuis, commonly known as Yundi guinea-flower, is a species of flowering plant in the family Dilleniaceae and is endemic to a restricted area of the Fleurieu Peninsula, South Australia. It is a delicate, low-lying to scrambling shrublet with hairy foliage, linear leaves and bright yellow flowers with four to six stamens on one side of two carpels.

Description
Flowering are present in most months.

Taxonomy
Hibbertia tenuis was first formally described in 1995 by Hellmut R. Toelken and Robert John Bates in the Journal of the Adelaide Botanic Gardens from specimens collected by Toelken near Yundi in 1991. The specific epithet (tenuifolia) means "delicate", referring to its habit compared to H. australis.

Distribution and habitat
This hibbertia grows in low or sparse vegetation in wetland and swampy areas near Mount Compass.

Conservation status
Hibbertia tenuis is listed as "critically endangered" under the Australian Government Environment Protection and Biodiversity Conservation Act 1999.

See also
List of Hibbertia species

References

tenuis
Flora of South Australia
Plants described in 1995
Taxa named by Hellmut R. Toelken
Taxa named by Robert John Bates